The 211th Battalion, CEF was a unit in the Canadian Expeditionary Force during the First World War.  Based in Vancouver, British Columbia, the unit began recruiting in early 1916 throughout British Columbia and Alberta.  After sailing to England in December 1916, the battalion was transferred to the 8th Battalion, Canadian Railway Troops in March 1917.  The 211th Battalion, CEF had one Officer Commanding: Lieut-Col. W. M. Sage.

See also
97th Battalion (American Legion), CEF 
212th Battalion (American Legion), CEF 
237th Battalion (American Legion), CEF

References
 Meek, John F. Over the Top! The Canadian Infantry in the First World War. Orangeville, Ont.: The Author, 1971.

Battalions of the Canadian Expeditionary Force
Military units and formations of British Columbia